Lisa R. Cohen is a television news magazine producer, known for writing about the Etan Patz case.

Biography and career highlights 
Cohen grew up in Winnipeg, Manitoba, and Philadelphia and graduated from the University of Pennsylvania with a degree in international relations and French.

At "PrimeTime Live" and then at "60 Minutes II," Cohen produced reports for Diane Sawyer, Sam Donaldson, Peter Jennings, Cynthia McFadden and others, on topics as diverse as the right to bear arms, have abortions and exercise the death penalty. She has covered some of the biggest moments in recent history including the TWA 800 crash, the Oklahoma City bombing, and the September 11 terror attacks. Her 1996 one-hour documentary for ABC News PrimeTime Live, "Judgment at Midnight," won multiple awards, including the NATAS Emmy; CINE Golden Eagle; International Film and Television Award; and the Foundation of American Women in Radio and Television "Gracie" award.

Cohen first learned about Etan's unsolved case while working at "PrimeTime Live." She subsequently produced several pieces on the story for network television before writing After Etan, which is her first book. Her book, After Etan: The Missing Child Case that Held America Captive, was published by Grand Central Publishing May 7, 2009.

In addition to writing After Etan, Cohen in 2010 began directing and producing "Serving Life" for the Oprah Winfrey Network, executive produced by Forest Whitaker. The documentary follows a group of inmates at Louisiana's Angola state penitentiary, who staff the inmate hospice there.

Cohen is also a media consultant, and she teaches journalism/television production at Columbia University Graduate School of Journalism. She was also a Princeton University Ferris Professor of Journalism.

She is a regular contributor to Women in Crime Ink, described by the Wall Street Journal as "a blog worth reading."

She is married and lives in New York City.

After Etan
After Etan: The Missing Child Case that Held America Captive tells the story of Etan Patz, considered the most famous missing child since the Lindbergh baby. Etan quite literally became the poster child for the new missing children's movement after the streets of New York City were plastered with his missing posters. In the two years after his disappearance, the Atlanta child murders - during which the bodies of dozens of young boys and girls were discovered in lakes, marshes, and ponds along roadside trails - and the abduction and murder of 6-year-old Adam Walsh in Hollywood, Florida, galvanized a nationwide movement for child protection and safety. Since 1983, May 25 has been recognized as National Missing Children's Day in honor of Etan and all the other children who have gone missing in America.

Awards 
 NATAS Emmy
 CINE Golden Eagle
 International Film and Television Award
 "Gracie Award", Foundation of American Women in Radio and Television

References

External links 
 Official Website
 After Etan website
 After Etan review
 Film.com celebrity film credits
 "The Original Milk-Carton Kid," The Daily Beast, about Lisa Cohen's efforts to solve the Etan case
 MediaBistro: TV Producer Lisa R. Cohen Discusses Her Book About Famous Child Disappearance Case, July 17, 2009

Living people
American women bloggers
American bloggers
American journalism academics
American non-fiction crime writers
American television journalists
American women television journalists
American television producers
American women television producers
Canadian emigrants to the United States
Canadian women journalists
Columbia University faculty
Columbia University Graduate School of Journalism faculty
Journalists from Manitoba
Writers from New York (state)
Writers from Winnipeg
Women crime writers
21st-century American essayists
Canadian women non-fiction writers
Year of birth missing (living people)
American women academics
21st-century American women writers